The following is a list of television and radio stations owned by and affiliated with the TV5 Network Inc. in the Philippines, including stations that airs TV5, One Sports and Radyo5.

Terrestrial and regional television stations

TV5

Analog

Network-owned stations

Affiliate stations
Most of TV5's affiliate relay stations are being run by sister company, Cignal TV, Inc. (d/b/a Mediascape, Inc.)

Digital

Digital affiliate stations

One Sports
(Operated through TV5's affiliate, Nation Broadcasting Corporation, except the Naga station, which is operated by Mediascape/Cignal TV)

Radio stations (Radyo5)

(Operated through TV5's affiliate, Nation Broadcasting Corporation)  Radyo5 TRUE FM announces its plans for its upcoming expansion to key cities nationwide soon as possible.

*Originating station.**Relay from DWFM Manila.

See also
Media of the Philippines
Apollo Broadcast Investors
Mediascape TV stations

References

ABC TV5 Stations
Philippine television-related lists